is a Japanese singer and a member of J-pop group PUFFY, along with Yumi Yoshimura.

Career
She has co-hosted several Japanese TV shows with the "cool" half of PUFFY, Yumi Yoshimura, including the talk show Pa-Pa-Pa-Pa-Puffy, part of a morning show called Saku-Saku, and the 2006 series Hi Hi Puffy Bu, in which Ami and Yumi perform one given task each week to comedic effect.

Personal life
She married Teru, the vocalist of the rock band Glay and announced the birth of their baby girl on her blog in March 2003. On PUFFY's 2007 greatest hits album Hit & Fun, Ami is pictured both on the CD cover and within the CD insert clearly wearing both an engagement and wedding ring on her left ring finger, and she continues to wear her wedding ring in pictures on the PUFFY Staff Diary.

Legacy
On Hi Hi Puffy AmiYumi, she is vocally portrayed by Japanese-American actress Janice Kawaye. In the show, her hair is pink and done in the classic odango atama hairstyle famously first worn by Usagi Tsukino from the Sailor Moon media franchise.

Instruments
Ami can play:
 Guitar
 Drums (PUFFY SPIKE Daisakusen - Owaranai Uta)
 Harmonica (Kore ga Watashi no Ikiru Michi)
 Timpani (Jet Tour '98 - Ai no Shirushi)
 Trumpet (Cosmic*Wonder)

Solo songs
Ami has sung the listed solo songs:

AmiYumi
 Usagi Channel (Rabbit Channel)

Solo Solo
 Onna no ko, Otoko no ko (Girls and Boys)
 Love Depth
 Honey
 That Sweet Smile
 Be Someone Tonight
 Snacks
 Tadaima (I'm Home)

Jet-CD
 Lemon Kid

Fever*Fever
 Always Dreamin' About You

The Hit Parade
 Aishuu Date (NEW YORK CITY NIGHTS)

Spike
 Destruction Pancake

Splurge
 Security Blanket

Solo single
On July 2, 1997, Ami and Yumi each released her own solo single before their original solo album, Solo Solo, released on 1997/08/06.

Track listing
 "Honey"
 "Tadaima (I'm Home)"
 "Honey (Original Karaoke)"
 "Tadaima (Original Karaoke)"

References

External links
 
 
 Home at Epic
 Hit & Run (Japanese management)
 Bar None Records
 Sony Music Artists Inc
 Puffy AmiYumi World

Puffy AmiYumi members
1973 births
Japanese women pop singers
People from Machida, Tokyo
Living people
Sony Music Entertainment Japan artists
Singers from Tokyo
21st-century Japanese singers
21st-century Japanese women singers
21st-century guitarists
21st-century women guitarists